The Pro-Cathedral of Ghardaïa, or simply Cathedral of Ghardaia, is a Roman Catholic church located in the town of Ghardaïa, Ghardaïa Province, Algeria. It succeeded an old Catholic cathedral dedicated to Saint-Hilarion in Laghouat which was secularized.

The pro-cathedral, or temporary cathedral of his jurisdiction, follows the Roman or Latin liturgical rite. It serves as the seat of the Diocese of Laghouat (Dioecesis Laghuatensis), which was established by decision of Pope Pius XII by bull Dum Tantis.

The church is under the pastoral responsibility of the Bishop Claude Rault Jean Narcisse.

See also
Cathédrale du Sacré-Cœur d'Alger
Roman Catholicism in Algeria

References

Roman Catholic cathedrals in Algeria
Buildings and structures in Ghardaïa Province
Ghardaïa